Buyers is the plural of a term used to describe someone who undertakes procurement on behalf of an organization.

Buyers may also refer to:

People with the surname Buyers 
 Jane Buyers (born 1948), Canadian multimedia artist
 John Buyers, British sailor circa 1800
 John W. A. "Doc" Buyers (1928-2006), American CEO of C. Brewer & Co.

See also 

 Buyer (disambiguation)